Diversitinus is an extinct genus of chalcid wasp, belonging to the extinct family Diversinitidae, of which it is the type genus. It contains a single species D. attenboroughi known from 2 male specimens from the earliest Cenomanian aged Burmese amber of the Hukawng Valley in Myanmar, around 99 million years old. The genus name originates from the Latin diversus, meaning different or diverse and initus which means origin or start, reflecting the great diversity of chalcid wasps. The species name is taken from the famous naturalist and broadcaster David Attenborough.

References

Burmese amber
Chalcidoidea